Benedetto "Nitto" Francesco Palma (born 3 March 1950 in Rome) is an Italian politician and magistrate. From July to November 2011 he served as Minister of Justice in the Berlusconi fourth government.

Biography

He was Judge instructor in Vicenza until 1979; from 1979 to 1993 he was deputy Prosecutor of the Republic in Rome.

In 1994 he was deputy head of the cabinet of the Minister of Justice Alfredo Biondi. He was then deputy Prosecutor in the National Antimafia Directorate.

In 2001 he has been elected to the Chamber of Deputies in the uninominal constituency of Oderzo. From 2006 to 2018 he served instead as a Senator. In 2011 he was appointed Minister of Justice in place of Angelino Alfano, who became the Secretary of The People of Freedom.

In the 2018 general election he has not been re-elected.

References

External links

		 	

1950 births
Forza Italia politicians
Living people
Politicians from Rome
The People of Freedom politicians
21st-century Italian politicians
Italian Ministers of Justice